This is a list of electoral results for the electoral district of Burke in Queensland state elections.

Members for Burke

Election results

Elections in the 1960s

Elections in the 1920s

Elections in the 1910s

Elections in the 1890s

References

Queensland state electoral results by district